is a high inclination centaur and damocloid from the outer regions of the Solar System, approximately 34 kilometers in diameter. It was first observed by astronomers at the Mauna Kea Observatories on 24 January 2007.

With a Tisserand's parameter of 1.99, may be considered a member of the damocloids, a dynamical group of minor planets which have comet-like orbits without showing a cometary coma or tail. It orbits the Sun at a distance of 17.7–30.2 AU once every 117 years and 6 months (42,907 days). Its orbit has an eccentricity of 0.26 and an inclination of 65° with respect to the ecliptic.

As of July 2017, it is one of 7 known objects with inclination (i) > 60° and perihelion (q) > 15 AU, along with the first discovered .

References

External links 
 List Of Centaurs and Scattered-Disk Objects, Minor Planet Center
 List of known Trans-Neptunian Objects, Johnston's Archive
 
 

Trans-Neptunian objects
Damocloids

Minor planet object articles (unnumbered)
20070124